Kama is translated from Sanskrit as pleasure, sensual gratification, sexual fulfillment or the aesthetic enjoyment of life

Kama may also refer to:

Places
Kama District, a district of Ningarhar province in Afghanistan 
Kama, Fukuoka, a city in Japan
Kama, Iran, a village in Gilan Provine, Iran
Kama (river), a tributary of the Volga in Russia
Kama valley, Tibet, a Himalayan valley, just east of Mount Everest
Kama tank school (German: Panzerschule Kama), a secret training school for tank commanders operated by the German Reichswehr near Kazan, Soviet Union

People
Kama (surname), Serer surname
Kama Tarkhan, legendary leader of the Huns
Charles Wright (wrestler), who performed as Kama

Military
Panzertruppenschule Kama, a secret Soviet-German military research training facility
 23rd Waffen Mountain Division of the SS Kama (2nd Croatian), a German military unit of World War II

Other
Kama (tool), Japanese sickle
Kama (Japanese tea ceremony), iron pots used to heat water in Japanese tea ceremonies
KAMA, the ICAO code for Rick Husband Amarillo International Airport
Kamadeva, a Hindu god
Nyko Kama, a wireless nunchuk for the Wii
Kama (food), Estonian food
Kama Automobile Company, a Chinese auto manufacturer.

See also
Karma
Kama Sutra
Cama (disambiguation)